Open is the debut studio album by the English recording artist Shaznay Lewis, following the break up of the  girl group All Saints. Released by London Records on 19 July 2004, it peaked at  22 on the UK Albums Chart.

Background
The title Open was chosen by Lewis while she was recording in the studio because she was "opened" to many new ideas at the time.

It includes two singles, "Never Felt Like This Before" and "You". Lewis was reportedly going to release a third single, "Nasty Boy", in March 2005, but this was a rumour.

Track #3 was originally called "Never Felt Like This Before" and the single and video were released under that name as well. However, on the album the title has been changed to "I Never Felt Like This Before".

There was an additional track called "Don't Know What to Say" which was removed from the album before it was released. It was removed because it was said to have been a weak song. The album (without any promotion) seems to have been re-released, as "Don't Know What to Say" is now an added track on the album. This change can be seen on the HMV website.

The final track, "Now You're Gone", was originally called "Crying" but was changed before the album was released. The song is included on the Shaznay Lewis Album Sampler which has five songs taken from Open; however, "Mr. Dawg" and "You" are both rough demos different from the album versions both vocally and melodically.

Track listing
Credits adapted from the liner notes of Open.

Charts

References

External links
 

2004 debut albums
Albums produced by Rick Nowels